The Holy Roman Empire was a claimed “successor state” to Charlemagne's Carolingian empire along with France and several other realms. The empire was a lot larger than modern day Germany and included the modern day countries Austria, the low countries, large parts of Eastern France, Northern Italy, Slovenia, parts of the northern Baltic, and Switzerland. Although the main culture was Germanic, this was not necessarily a single cultural identity and there were large differences in local dialect. Additionally many foreign cultures had influence on the culture and language of the border territories (France, Italy, Poland, Denmark, Hungary). The structure of the nobility is complicated in that many different titles were used across the empire and do not necessarily mean the same thing in different contexts. It is also complicated because the number of lords holding land directly from the Emperor is so high and each of these lordships functioned as a semi-independent state pursuing their own interests. The vassals of the Emperor would generally have vassals of their own such as Knights, Castellans, and Ministerialis. Occasionally they would have lords as their vassals if they were powerful enough. Sometimes a knight or lord would act as a vogt (an advocate) for a prelate or prince-bishop (a bishop who owns a large fief and has secular rights). These vogts would be responsible for leading the bishops troops and administering justice by the sword (giving them quite a bit of power).  Many of the German nobles did not practice primogeniture and had their estates split between their male heirs, though often they worked together in their common interests.

The 13th century was a particularly fragmented time in the history of the Holy Roman Empire due to the great interregnum (1245-1275). Even with one Emperor who had enough land and power to wield kingly power the Holy Roman Empire was split into hundreds of fiefdoms whose holders were often at war with each-other. Although the Empire started off as probably the greatest power in Europe, at the time under Frederick II, Holy Roman Emperor who ruled the duchy of Swabia, the kingdom of Sicily, and the kingdom of Jerusalem, Imperial power slowly disintegrated as the pope encouraged anti-kings to curb Frederick's power due to his invasions into northern Italy. When Frederick died in 1250 there were two claimants to the throne: his son Conrad IV, and William II of Holland supported by the pope. Both of these kings died before 1257 and left a massive power vacuum which foreign royalty sought to use to become Emperor (Richard of Cornwall, Alfonso X). Richard of Cornwall was very rich and was able to gain four votes using bribes. He was crowned King of the Romans in Aachen by the Archbishop of Cologne in 1257 while Alfonso never even set foot in Germany. After Richards death in 1272 the powerful Swabian expansionist Count Rudolf I of Germany was elected emperor and reigned until 1291. Following his death the count of Nassau Adolf, King of the Romans took over as king of the Romans. However he was deposed in 1298 by a coalition of powerful nobles spearheaded by the King of Bohemia, the Archbishop of Cologne, and the Margrave of Brandenburg for his aggressive policy in Thuringia. The previous King Rudolf's son Albert I of Germany was elected and the Interregnum finally ended.

Emperors and emperor claimants 
The rulers of the Holy Roman Empire were crowned in the city of Aachen as King of the Romans (or King of Germany) by the archbishops of Cologne. Under normal circumstances they would also be crowned as Emperor by the Pope but throughout most of the thirteenth century this was not the case.

Lords with imperial immediacy 
The Holy Roman empire was essentially a confederacy of rulers who theoretically owed allegiance to the Emperor who was elected from the 7 prince-electors Prince-elector.  From the start of the 13th century there was a dispute between the House of Welf and the House of Hohenstaufen over who was the rightful ruler of the empire which resulted in a fractured empire for most of the 13th century. The main political players within the Holy Roman Empire were the prince-electors, anointed kings, princes, and other palatine lords who wielded large amounts of influence on their vassals and also their smaller neighbors. They were also direct vassals of the emperor himself and possessed palatine powers. The regions listed are purely for contextualization and do not reflect exactly how the medieval world would have necessarily made their provincial divisions. The regions are alphabetically ordered and the princes are listed in order of precedence.

Within Bohemia 

Kings of Bohemia – Ottokar I of Bohemia (1292-1230), Wenceslaus I of Bohemia (1230–1253), Ottokar II of Bohemia (1253–1278), Wenceslaus II of Bohemia (1278–1305)

Within Burgundy 

Counts of Burgundy – Otto I, Duke of Merania (1208–1231), Otto III, Count of Burgundy (1231–1248), Adelaide, Countess of Burgundy (1248–1279), Hugh, Count of Burgundy (1248–1266 by right of his wife), Philip I, Count of Savoy (1267–1279), Otto IV, Count of Burgundy (1279–1303)

Counts of Albon & Dauphins of Viennois – Beatrice of Albon (1162–1228), Guigues VI of Viennois (1228–1237), Guigues VII of Viennois (1237–1269), John I of Viennois (1269–1282), Humbert I of Viennois (1282–1307)

Principality of Orange – William I of Baux (1180–1218), William II of Baux (1180–1239), William III of Baux (1239–1257), Raymond I of Baux (1218–1282), Bertrand IV of Baux (1282–1314)

Counts of Provence – Alfonso II, Count of Provence (1185–1209),

Counts of Geneva – Humbert I of Geneva (1195–1220), William II of Geneva (1220–1252), Rudolf of Geneva (1252–1265), Aymon II of Geneva (1265–1280), Amadeus II of Geneva (1280–1308)

Counts of Savoy – Thomas, Count of Savoy (1189–1233), Amadeus IV, Count of Savoy (1233–1253), Boniface, Count of Savoy (1253–1263), Peter II, Count of Savoy (1263–1268), Philip I, Count of Savoy (1268–1285), Amadeus V, Count of Savoy (1285–1323)

Counts of Montbeliard – Richard III of Montfaucon (1195–1227), Theodoric III of Montbéliard (1227–1283), Guillemette of Neufchâtel (1283–1317)

Prince-Bishops of Besancon – Amadeus de Tramelay (1197–1220), Gerard I. de Rougemont 1221–1225, John Halgren of Abbeville (1225–1227), Nicolas de Flavigny 1227–1235, Gottfried II. 1236–1241, Jean II. 1242–1244, Guillaume II. de la Tour 1245–1268, Odo de Rougemont 1269–1301

Within Carinthia 

Dukes of Carinthia – Bernhard von Spanheim (1202–1256), Ulrich III, Duke of Carinthia (1256–1269), Ottokar II of Bohemia (1269–1276), Rudolf I of Germany (1276–1286), Meinhard, Duke of Carinthia (1286–1295), Henry of Bohemia (1295–1335)

Patriarchs of Aquileia – Pellegrino II of Aquileia (1195–1204), Wolfger von Erla (1204–1218), Berthold (patriarch of Aquileia) (1218–1251), Gregorio di Montelongo (1251–1269), Philip of Spanheim (1269–1273), Raimondo della Torre (1273–1299)

Dukes of Austria – Leopold VI, Duke of Austria (1198–1230), Frederick II, Duke of Austria (1230–1246), (Interregnum (1246–1278), Rudolf IV, Duke of Austria (1278–1282), Albert I of Germany (1282–1308)

Margraves of Verona – Herman V, Margrave of Baden-Baden (1190–1243), Ezzelino III da Romano (1223–1233), Herman VI, Margrave of Baden (1243–1250), Frederick I, Margrave of Baden (1250–1268)

Dukes of Merania & Margraves of Istria – Berthold, Duke of Merania (1188–1204), Henry II, Margrave of Istria (1204–1228), Otto I, Duke of Merania (1228–1234), Otto III, Count of Burgundy (1234–1248)

Within Frisia 

Counts of Flanders – Baldwin I, Latin Emperor (1194–1205), Joan, Countess of Flanders (1205–1244), Margaret II, Countess of Flanders (1244–1278), Guy, Count of Flanders (1278–1305)

Counts of Holland – Dirk VII, Count of Holland (1190–1203), Ada, Countess of Holland (1203–1207), William I, Count of Holland (1203–1222), Floris IV, Count of Holland (1222–1234), William II of Holland (1239–1256), Floris V, Count of Holland (1246–1296), John I, Count of Holland (1296–1299)

Prince-Bishops of Utrecht – Dirk van Are (1197–1212), Otto I (bishop of Utrecht) (1212–1215), Otto II van Lippe (1216–1227), Wilbrand van Oldenburg (1227–1233), Otto III van Holland (1233–1249), Gozewijn van Amstel (van Randerath) (1249–1250), Henry I van Vianden (1250–1267), John I, Bishop-Elect of Utrecht (1267–1290), John II van Sierck (1290–1296), Willem II Berthout (1296–1301)

Counts of Guelders – Otto I, Count of Guelders (1182–1207), Gerard III, Count of Guelders (1207–1229), Otto II, Count of Guelders (1229–1271), Reginald I, Count of Guelders (1271–1318)

Duchy of Limburg – Henry III, Duke of Limburg (1165–1221), Waleran III, Duke of Limburg (1221–1226), Henry IV, Duke of Limburg (1226–1247), Waleran IV, Duke of Limburg (1247–1279), Reginald I of Guelders (1280–1288), John I, Duke of Brabant (1288–1294), John II, Duke of Brabant (1294–1312)

Within Franconia 

Counts-Palatine of the Rhine – Henry V, Count Palatine of the Rhine (1195–1213), Henry VI, Count Palatine of the Rhine (1213–1214), Louis I, Duke of Bavaria (1214–1231), Otto II, Duke of Bavaria (1228–1253), Louis II, Duke of Bavaria (1255–1271), Rudolf I, Duke of Bavaria (1294–1317)

Archbishops of Mainz – Siegfried II (archbishop of Mainz) (1200–1230), Siegfried III (archbishop of Mainz) (1230–1249), Christian II (archbishop of Mainz) (1249–1251), Gerhard I von Daun-Kirberg 1251–1259, Werner II von Eppstein 1260–1284, Heinrich II von Isny 1286–1288, Gerhard II von Eppstein 1286–1305

Burgraves of Nuremberg – Frederick I, Burgrave of Nuremberg (1192–1204), Frederick IV, Count of Zollern (1204–1218), Conrad I, Burgrave of Nuremberg (1218–1262), Frederick III, Burgrave of Nuremberg (1262–1297), John I, Burgrave of Nuremberg (1297–1300)

Landgraves of Thuringia – Hermann I, Landgrave of Thuringia (1190–1217), Louis IV, Landgrave of Thuringia (1217–1227), Hermann II, Landgrave of Thuringia (1227–1241), Henry Raspe, Landgrave of Thuringia (1241–1247), Henry III, Margrave of Meissen (1247–1265), Albert II, Margrave of Meissen (1265–1294), Frederick I, Margrave of Meissen (1298–1323)

Prince-Bishops of Wurzburg – Konrad von Querfurt (1197–1202), Heinrich IV von Katzburg (1202–1207), Otto von Lobdeburg (1207–1223), Dietrich von Homburg (1223–1225), Hermann I von Lobdeburg (1225–1254), Iring von Reinstein-Homburg (1254–1266), Heinrich V von Leiningen (1254–1255), Poppo III von Trimberg (1266–1271), Berthold I von Henneberg (1271–1274), Berthold II von Sternberg (1274–1287), Mangold von Neuenburg (1287–1303)

Prince-Bishops of Worms – Luitpold von Schonfeld (1196–1217), Henry II of Saarbrücken (1217–1234), Landolf of Hoheneck (1234–1247), Konrad III von Durkheim (1247), Richard of Dhaun (1247–1257), Eberhard I of Baumberg (1257–1277), Friedrich of Baumberg (1277–1283), Simon von Schoneck (1283–1291), Eberhard II von Strahlenberg (1291–1293), Emicho of Baumberg (1294–1299)

Prince-Abbots of Corvey -

Prince-Abbots of Fulda -

Within Italy 

Kings of Sicily – Frederick II, Holy Roman Emperor (1198–1250), Henry II of Sicily (1212–1217 joint rule), Conrad IV of Germany (1250–1254), Conradin (de jure 1254–1268), Manfred, King of Sicily (de facto as rival 1258–1266), Charles I of Anjou (as usurper, leaves HRE 1266–1282), Peter III of Aragon (1282–1285), James II of Aragon (1285–1295), Frederick III of Sicily (1285–1337)

Dukes of Spoleto – Conrad II, Duke of Spoleto (1198–1205), Henry von Urslingen (1205), Dipold, Count of Acerra (1209–1225), Rainald of Urslingen (1223–1230), Conrad III, Duke of Spoleto (1227–1267), Rainald of Urslingen (1251–1276)

Kings of Sardinia – Enzo of Sardinia (1238–1245)

Imperial-Vicar of Tuscany – Frederick of Antioch (1246–1250)

Within lower Lorraine 

Archbishops of Cologne – Adolf of Altena (1192–1205), Bruno IV von Sayn (1205–1208), Dietrich I von Hengebach (1208–1215), Engelbert II of Berg (1216–1225), Heinrich I von Müllenark (1225–1237), Konrad von Hochstaden (1238–1261), Engelbert II von Falkenburg (1261–1274), Siegfried II of Westerburg (1274–1297), Wigbold von Holte (1297–1304)

Duchy of Brabant – Henry I, Duke of Brabant (1190–1235), Henry II, Duke of Brabant (1235–1248), Henry III, Duke of Brabant (1248–1261), Henry IV, Duke of Brabant (1261–1267), John I, Duke of Brabant (1267–1294), John II, Duke of Brabant (1294–1312)

Prince-Bishops of Liege – Hugh of Pierrepont (1220–1229), John of Eppes (1229–1238), William of Savoy (1238–1239), Robert of Thourotte (1240–1246), Henry of Guelders (1247–1274), John of Enghien (1274–1281), John of Flanders (1282–1291), Hugh of Chalon (1295–1301)

Prince Bishops of Cambrai – Guiard of Laon (1238–1248), Ingeramus de Crequy (1274–1286), Guillaume de Hainault (1286–1296), Gui de Collemedio (1296–1306)

Counts of Cleves – Arnold II, Count of Cleves (1198–1201), Dietrich V, Count of Cleves (1201–1260), Dietrich VI, Count of Cleves (1260–1275), Dietrich VII, Count of Cleves (1275–1305)

Counts of Julich – William III, Count of Jülich (1207–1219), William IV, Count of Jülich (1219–1278), Walram, Count of Jülich (1278–1297), Gerhard V of Jülich (1297–1328)

Abbots of Echternach -

Within Lombardy 

Archbishops of Milan – Filippo I da Lampugnano (1196–1206), Umberto IV da Pirovano (1206–1211), Gerardo da Sesso (1211–1212), Enrico I da Settala (1213–1230), Guglielmo I da Rizolio (1230–1241), Leon da Perego (1241–1257), Ottone Visconti (1262–1295), Ruffino da Frisseto (1295–1296), Francesco I da Parma (1296–1308)

Prince bishops of Trent – Federico Wanga (1207–1218), Gerard I Oscasali (1223–1232), Aldrighetto di Castelcampo (1232–1247), Egno von Eppan (1250–1273), Henry II (1273–1289), Philipp Buonacolsi (1289–1303)

Prince Bishops of Brixen -

Within the northeastern marches 

Margraves of Brandenburg – Otto II, Margrave of Brandenburg (1184–1205), Albert II, Margrave of Brandenburg (1205–1220), John I, Margrave of Brandenburg (1220–1266), Otto III, Margrave of Brandenburg (1220–1267)

Brandenburg-Stendal – John II, Margrave of Brandenburg-Stendal (1266–1282), Otto IV, Margrave of Brandenburg-Stendal (1266–1309), Henry I, Margrave of Brandenburg-Stendal (1294–1318)

Brandenburg-Salzwedel – John III, Margrave of Brandenburg-Salzwedel (1267–1268), Otto V, Margrave of Brandenburg-Salzwedel (1267–1298), Otto VI, Margrave of Brandenburg-Salzwedel (1267–1286), Albert III, Margrave of Brandenburg-Salzwedel (1267–1300)

Teutonic Order – Heinrich von Tunna (1208–1209), Hermann von Salza (1209–1239), Konrad von Thüringen (1239–1240), Gerhard von Malberg (1240–1244), Heinrich von Hohenlohe (1244–1249), Gunther von Wüllersleben (1249–1252), Poppo von Osterna (1252–1256), Anno von Sangershausen (1256–1273), Hartmann von Heldrungen (1273–1282), Burchard von Schwanden (1282–1283), Konrad von Feuchtwangen (1290–1297), Gottfried von Hohenlohe (1297–1303)

Dukes of Pomerania – Bogislaw VIII, Duke of Pomerania (1264–1278), Bogislaw IV (1278–1295), Barnim II (1295), Otto I, Duke of Pomerania (1295–1344)

Dukes of Pomerania-Demmin – Casimir II, Duke of Pomerania (1187–1219), Wartislaw III, Duke of Pomerania (1219–1264)

Dukes of Pomerania Stettin – Bogislaw II, Duke of Pomerania (1208–1220), Barnim I (1226–1264)

Dukes of Pomerania Schlawe-Stolp -Bogislaw III, Duke of Pomerania (1190–1223), Ratibor II (1223–1238),

Prince-Bishops of Ratzeburg – Isfried  1180–1204, Philipp  1204–1215, Heinrich I 1215–1228, Lambert von Barmstede 1228, Gottschalk 1229–1235, Petrus 1236, Ludolph I of Ratzeburg 1236–1250, Friedrich 1250–1257, Ulrich von Blücher 1257–1284, Konrad 1284–129, Hermann von Blücher 1291–1309

Counts of Lichtenburg -

Within Saxony 

Margrave of Miessin – Theodoric I, Margrave of Meissen (1198–1221), Henry III, Margrave of Meissen (1230–1288), Albert II, Margrave of Meissen (1288–1292), Frederick I, Margrave of Meissen (1291–1323)

Dukes/Princes of Brunwick-Luneburg – Otto I, Duke of Brunswick-Lüneburg (1235–1252), Albert I, Duke of Brunswick-Lüneburg (1252–1279), John, Duke of Brunswick-Lüneburg (1269–1277), Otto II, Duke of Brunswick-Lüneburg (1282–1330), Henry I, Duke of Brunswick-Grubenhagen (1279–1322)

Archbishops/Administrators of Bremen – Hartwig of Uthlede (1192–1207), Burchard of Stumpenhusen (1207–1210), Valdemar of Denmark (bishop)  (1210–1217), Gerard of Oldenburg-Wildeshausen (1210–1219), Gerhard II (Bremen & Hamburg) (1219–1258), Hildebold of Wunstorf (1258–1273), Gilbert of Bronckhorst (1274–1306)

Archbishops of Madgeburg – Ludolf of Koppenstedt (1192–1205), Albert I of Käfernburg (1205–1232), Burkhard I of Woldenberg (1232–1235), Wilbrand of Kasernberg (1235–1254), Rudolf of Dinselstadt (1254–1260), Rupert of Mansfeld (1260–1266), Conrad II of Sternberg (1266–1277), Günther I of Schwalenberg (1277–1279), Bernhard III of Wolpe (1279–1282), Eric of Brandenburg (1282–1295), Burkhard II of Blankenburg (1295–1305)

Princes of Anhalt – Bernhard, Count of Anhalt (1170–1212), Henry I, Count of Anhalt (1212–1252)

Princes of Anhalt-Aschersleben – Henry II, Prince of Anhalt-Aschersleben (1252–1266), Henry III, Prince of Anhalt-Aschersleben (1270–1283), Otto I, Prince of Anhalt-Aschersleben (1270–1304)

Princes of Anhalt-Bernburg – Bernhard I, Prince of Anhalt-Bernburg (1252–1287), Bernhard II, Prince of Anhalt-Bernburg (1287–1323)

Princes of Anhalt-Zerbst – Siegfried I, Prince of Anhalt-Zerbst (1252–1298), Albert I, Prince of Anhalt-Zerbst (1298–1316)

Counts of Mark – Adolf I, Count of the Mark (1198–1249), Engelbert I, Count of the Mark (1249–1277), Eberhard II, Count of the Mark (1277–1308)

Prince-Bishops of Bamberg – Thimo von Lyskirch (1196–1201), Konrad von Ergersheim (1202–1203), Ekbert of Andechs (1203–1231), Siegfried von Öttingen (1231–1238), Poppo of Andechs (1238–1242), Heinrich I von Bilversheim (1242–1257), Ladislaus of Salzburg (1257), Berthold von Leiningen (1257–1285), Mangold von Neuenburg (1285), Arnold von Solms (1286–1296), Leopold I von Grundlach (1296–1303)

Prince-Bishops of Osnabruck – Engelbert I von Isenberg (1224–1226), Konrad I von Velber (1227–1239), Engelbert I von Isenberg (1239–1250), Bruno von Isenberg (1251–1258), Balduin von Rüssel (1259–1264), Widukind von Waldeck (1265–1269), Konrad von Rietberg (1270–1297), Ludwig von Ravensberg (1297–1308)

Abbots of Walkried -

Within Swabia 

Dukes of Swabia – Philip of Swabia (11198-1208), Frederick II, Holy Roman Emperor (1212–1216), Henry (VII) of Germany (1216–1235), Conrad IV of Germany (1235–1254), Conradin (1254–1268)

Margraves of Baden-Baden – Herman V, Margrave of Baden-Baden (1190–1243), Herman VI, Margrave of Baden (1243–1250), Frederick I, Margrave of Baden (1250–1268), Rudolf I, Margrave of Baden-Baden (1250–1288), Herman VII, Margrave of Baden-Baden (1288–1291), Rudolf II, Margrave of Baden-Baden (1288–1295), Rudolf III, Margrave of Baden-Baden (1288–1332), Hesso, Margrave of Baden-Baden (1288–1297)

Count-Palatines of Tubingen – Rudolph I, Count Palatine of Tübingen (~1200-1219), Rudolph II, Count Palatine of Tübingen (1219–1247), Hugo IV, Count Palatine of Tübingen (1247~1270)

Margraves of Baden-Pforzheim – Herman VIII, Margrave of Baden-Pforzheim (1291–1300), Rudolf IV, Margrave of Baden-Pforzheim (1291-1248)

Margraves of Baden-Eberstein – Frederick II, Margrave of Baden-Eberstein (1291–1333)

Margraves of Baden-Hachberg – Henry I, Margrave of Baden-Hachberg (1190–1231), Henry II, Margrave of Baden-Hachberg (1231–1289), Henry III, Margrave of Baden-Hachberg (1289–1330)

Margraves of Baden-Hachberg-Sausenburg – Rudolf I, Margrave of Hachberg-Sausenberg (1290–1313)

Prince-Bishops of Basel – Leuthold I von Rotheln (1192–1213), Walther von Rotheln (1213–1215), Heinrich II von Thun (1216–1238), Leuthold II von Arburg (1238–1249), Berthold II von Pfirt (1250–1262), Heinrich III von Neuenburg-Erguel (1262–1274), Heinrich IV Knoderer (1275–1286), Peter I Reich von Reichenstein (1286–1296), Peter von Aspelt (1297–1306)

Prince-Bishops of Augsburg – Hartwig II (Augsburg) (1202–1208), Siegfried III. von Rechberg (1208–1227), Siboto von Seefeld (1227–1247), Hartmann of Dillingen (1248–1286), Siegfried IV von Algertshausen (1286–1288), Wolfhard von Roth (1288–1302)

Prince-Bishops of Constance – Diethelm von Krenkingen (1190–1206), Wernher von Staufen (1206–1209), Konrad von Tegerfelden (1209–1233), Heinrich von Tanne (1233–1248), Eberhard II von Waldburd-Thann (1248–1274), Rudolf von Habsburg-Laufenburg (1274–1293), Henrich von Klingenberg (1293–1306)

Dukes of Teck – Adalbert II, Duke of Teck, Conrad II of Teck (~1260-1292)

Counts of Wurttemberg – Hartmann, Count of Württemberg (1181–1236), Ludwig III, Count of Württemberg (1194–1226), Ulrich I, Count of Württemberg (1241–1265), Ulrich II, Count of Württemberg (1265–1279), Eberhard I, Count of Württemberg (1279–1325)

Counts of Eberstein -

Landgraves of Hesse – Henry I, Landgrave of Hesse (1264–1308)

Abbots of Comburg -

Abbots of Disentis -

Abbots of Ellwangen -

Abbots of Weissenau -

Abbots of Bachau -

Within upper Lorraine 

Archbishops or Trier – John I, Archbishop of Trier (1189–1212), Theoderich von Wied (1212–1242), Arnold II von Isenburg (1242–1259), Heinrich I Finstingen (1260–1286), Bohemond I (archbishop of Trier) (1286–1299)

Counts/Princes of Luxemburg – Ermesinde, Countess of Luxembourg (1197–1247), Theobald I, Count of Bar (1197–1214), Waleran III of Limburg (1214–1226), Henry V, Count of Luxembourg (1247–1281), Henry VI, Count of Luxembourg (1281–1288), Henry VII, Holy Roman Emperor (1288–1313)

Prince-Bishops of Metz -

Abbots of Burtscheid -

Within Provence

Counts of Provence -

Sub-Vassals

Within Bavaria

Under the Teutonic Order 

Bailiffs of An der Etsch

Under the dukes of Bavaria 

Abbots of Diessen -

Within Bohemia

Under the kings of Bohemia 

Dukes/Margraves of Moravia – Vladislaus III, Duke of Bohemia (1197–1222), Vladislaus II of Moravia (1223–1227), Přemysl (1227–1239), Vladislaus III of Moravia (1239–1247), Ottokar II of Bohemia (1247–1278), Rudolph I of Germany (1278–1283), Wenceslaus II of Bohemia (1283–1305)

Dukes of Troppau – Nicholas I, Duke of Troppau (1269–1318)

Lords of Krumlov – Vitek II (1194–1236), Zavis (d. 1257) (1236–1257), Budivoj z Krumlova (1257–1277), Wok z Krumlova (1277–1302)

Within Burgundy

Under the Teutonic Order 

Bailiffs of Alsace -

Under the counts of Montbeliard 

Lords of Grandvillars

Under the counts of Savoy 

Lords of Gruyeres

Under the prince-bishops of Basel 

Lords of Rotteln

Within Carinthia

Under the patriarchs of Aquileia 

Lords of Colloredo-Mansfeld -

Lords of Friuli

Within Frisia

Under the counts of Guelders 

Lords of Myllendonk till 1279 transfer to Cologne

Lords of Vianden

Within Franconia

Under the landgraves of Thuringia 

Lords of Hatzfeld

Within lower Lorraine

Under the archbishops of Cologne 

Lords of Bassenheim – Bruno II of Isenburg-Braunsberg (~1210~1255), Waldbott von Waltmannshausen (~1255~1300)

Lords of Beilstein – (1268–1361)

Bishops of Paderborn

Lords of Ulmen/Rheineck

Under the counts of Cleves 

Lords of Gemen

Lords of Moers

Under the dukes of Brabant 

Lords of Gemert

Under the prince-bishops of Liege 

Lords of Mechelen

Within the northeastern Marches

Under the margraves of Brandenburg 

Counts of Wernigerode – Albert III of Wernigerode (1173–1214), Burchard of Wernigerode (1217–1231), Conrad I of Wernigerode (1217–1252), Gebhard I of Wernigerode (1217–1269), Conrad II of Wernigerode (1254–1293), Albert V of Wernigerode (1268–1319), Conrad III of Wernigerod (1297–1339)

Lords of Pomerania-Stettin

Under the counts of Lichtenberg 

Lords of Oberbronn

Within Saxony

Under the dukes of Brunswick-Luneburg 

Lords of Blankenburg – (1202–1344)

Lords of Regenstein-Regenstein

Lords of Regenstein-Hainburg

Lords of Regestein elder Line

Lords of Namur

Within Swabia

Under the margraves of Baden 

Abbots of Lichtenthal

Within upper Lorraine

Under the archbishops of Trier 

Lords of Franzenheim -

Lords of Isenburg-Kempenich

Lords of Isenburg-Kobern

Lords of Leyen

Baillifs of Koblenz

Under the prince-bishops of Metz 

Counts of Saarbrucken

Ministerialis and Knights

Imperial ministralis and Knights 

Bligger von Steinach - Ministerialis

Within Carinthia

Under the margraves of Istria 

Ulrich von Liechtenstein - Ministerialis

Stadeck - Ministerialis

Within the northeastern Marches

Under the margraves of Meissen 

Heinrich von Morungen - Ministerialis

Within Swabia

Under the counts of Rapperswil 

Albrecht von Rapperswil - Ministerialis

Medieval nobility of the Holy Roman Empire